Princess Apolonia Poniatowski (17 January 1736 – 1814) was a Polish noblewoman, the sister-in-law of the King of Poland, Stanisław August Poniatowski.

Biography 
She was the daughter of Bazyli Ustrzycki (1715-1751), castellan of Przemyśl and his second wife, Katarzyna Zielonka (b.1715). She married Prince Antoni Lubomirski in 1749, and Prince Kazimierz Poniatowski on 21 January 1751.

In 1763, her brother-in-law was elected king of Poland. She became the mother of Stanisław, Grand Treasurer of Lithuania, and Konstancja Poniatowska.

Her second marriage was unhappy. Her husband was known for his love life and was famously one of the clients of Henrietta Lullier.

References
 Polski Słownik Biograficzny; t. 18 str. 6: psb.15683.6, t. 27 str. 444: psb.23687.4, t. 27 str. 481: psb.23692.3
 W. Dworzaczek; („Genealogia” i „Teki Dworzaczka”) - dw.4882, dw.9101

1736 births
1814 deaths
Apolonia
Poniatowski family
18th-century Polish women
18th-century Polish nobility